Baldivieso is a surname. Notable people with the surname include:

 Enrique Baldivieso, Bolivian politician
 Julio César Baldivieso, Bolivian footballer 
 Mauricio Baldivieso, Bolivian footballer

See also
 Enrique Baldivieso Province, province in the Bolivian department of Potosí